Religious violence in Odisha consists of civil unrest and riots in the remote forest region surrounding the Kandhamal district in the western parts of the Indian state of Odisha.

The Kandhamal district contains several tribal reservations where only tribal people can own land. The largest community in Kandhamal is the Kandha tribe. Most Kandha tribal people follow tribal and animistic forms of Hinduism. However, the socio-economic and political landscape of Kandhamal is dominated by its second-largest community, the non-tribal Pana caste. The region is also home to the Maoist guerrillas, a revolutionary communist movement. Maoist leader Sabyasachi Panda stated groups tend to recruit most of their leaders and cadre insurgents from tribal communities. He reiterated the Maoists's religious position: "We do not believe in any religion or are attached to any religious groups. We are not in favour of any religion."

Major issues in Kandhamal that have led to tensions are claims that "The Scheduled Caste and the Scheduled Tribes (Prevention of Atrocities) Act" is violated. Such claims include the forcible occupation of tribal land, fake issuance of tribal  and exploiting tribals for insurgent activities. This previously resulted in civil unrest and communal tensions in 1986, 1994 and 2001.

Background

Historical background of conversions
Franciscan missionary Friar Odoric visited India in the 14th century and wrote about his visit to Puri in a journal which he later published in Europe. In the journal, Odoric wrote in detail about a huge chariot containing idols of Hindu deities from the grand and famous Jagannath temple which is taken out annually in a procession known as the rath yatra. Odoric's account of the ceremony spread throughout Europe and by the 19th century the word juggernaut began to be associated with an unstoppable force of such proportions that is capable of destroying everything in its path. Subsequently, Baptist missionaries came to Odisha in 1822 during the British Empire's colonial rule over India.

After India's independence
The communal disharmony arose even before Indian independence in 1947 on aforementioned issue of religious conversion. Conversions have been legislated by the provisions of the Freedom of Religion Acts (acts replicated in numerous other parts through India). Odisha was the first provinces of independent India to enact legislation in regards to religious conversions. The Orissa Freedom of Religion Act, 1967, mentions that no person shall "convert or attempt to convert, either directly or otherwise, any person from one religious faith to another by the use of force or by inducement or by any fraudulent means". Christian missions have been active in Odisha among the tribals and backward Hindu castes from the early years of the twentieth century.Right-wing Hindus have alleged that the increase in the number of Christians in Odisha has been a result of exploitation of illiteracy and impoverishment by the missionaries in contravention of the law, instead of free will.

Conversion controversy
Behind the clashes are long-simmering tensions between equally impoverished groups: the Kandha tribe, who are 80% of the population, and the Pana. Both are original inhabitants of the land.  There has been an Indian tradition of untouchability. Dalits, considered lower caste people, are subject to social and economic discrimination. This is outlawed in the Indian constitution. The prejudices remain. Conversion from untouchability has encouraged millions of such people to escape from their circumstances through joining other religions. The Panas have converted to Christianity in large numbers and prospered financially . Over the past several decades, most of the Panas have become Dalit Christians.

Hindu nationalist groups have blamed the violence on the issue of religious conversion. Conversions have been legislated by the provisions of the Freedom of Religion Acts, replicated in some of the states in India. Odisha was the first state of independent India to enact legislation on religious conversions. The Orissa Freedom of Religion Act, 1967, stipulates that 'no person shall "convert or attempt to convert, either directly or otherwise, any person from one religious faith to another by the use of force or by inducement or by any fraudulent means"'. Hindus claim the Christian missionaries were converting poor tribal people by feeding them beef, which is taboo in Hinduism.

The missionaries would upgrade the mud houses of the converts into brick-lime. Hindus have further alleged that the increase in the number of Christians in Odisha has been a result of exploitation of illiteracy and impoverishment by the missionaries. The Census of India shows that Christian population in Kandhamal grew from around 43,000 in 1981 to 117,950 in 2001.

Staines killing
Graham Staines was an Australian Christian missionary working with the Evangelical Missionary Society of Mayurbhanj, an Australian missionary society that was engaged in the education of poor and illiterate indigenous tribes in Odisha. He also worked among the leprosy patients in the region. On the night of 22 January 1999, he was sleeping in his station wagon when it was set afire. Graham and his two sons, ten-year-old Philip and six-year-old Timothy, were killed. Dara Singh, a Hindu fundamentalist from Etawah in Uttar Pradesh, was arrested for the crime. On 22 September 2003 a court appointed by the Central Bureau of Investigation sentenced Dara Singh to death and 12 others to life imprisonment for the murders.

Dara Singh, as an active Bajrang Dal follower, was suspected of being involved in a larger conspiracy. However, the Wadhwa Commission ruled out the involvement of any organization in the killings. In May 2005, the Odisha High Court commuted Singh's sentence to life imprisonment.

The murders were widely condemned by religious and civic leaders, politicians, and journalists. The US-based Human Rights Watch accused the then Indian Government of failing to prevent violence against Christians, and of exploiting sectarian tensions for political ends. The organisation said attacks against Christians increased "significantly" since the "Hindu Nationalist" BJP came to power. Then-Prime Minister of India, Atal Behari Vajpayee, a leader of BJP, condemned the "ghastly attack" and called for swift action to catch the killers. Published reports stated that church leaders alleged the attacks were carried out at the behest of hardline Hindu organisations. Hindu hardliners accused Christian missionaries of forcibly converting poor and low-caste Hindus and tribals. The convicted killer Dara Singh was treated as a hero by hardline Hindus and reportedly protected by some villagers. In an interview with the Hindustan Times, one of the accused killers, Mahendra Hembram, stated that the killers "were provoked by the "corruption of tribal culture" by the missionaries, who they claimed fed villagers beef and gave women brassieres and sanitary towels."

In her affidavit before the Commission on the death of her husband and two sons, Gladys Staines stated:

"The Lord God is always with me to guide me and help me to try to accomplish the work of Graham, but I sometimes wonder why Graham was killed and also what made his assassins behave in such a brutal manner on the night of 22nd/23rd January 1999. It is far from my mind to punish the persons who were responsible for the death of my husband Graham and my two children. But it is my desire and hope that they would repent and would be reformed."

Ranalai incident

On 16 March 1999 a Hindu mob of 5,000 attacked Ranalai (PIN – 761 017) in Gajapati District and set houses on fire and engaged in looting.  Three Christian people were injured. The then Chief Minister of Odisha, Sri Giridhar Gamang, visited the village the next day.

December 2007

Incident at Brahmanigaon, Phulbani on 24 December 
In December 2007, Christians had installed a Christmas arch across the road in the town of Brahmanigaon, Kandhamal district, having first received a permit from the police and sub-collector to do so. On 24 December 2007 a group of 150–200 Hindus arrived at the town market and demanded that the arch be removed.  The protesters argued that the arch along with a tent set up was erected on the very site used by the Hindus to celebrate the Durga Puja festival in October. Protesters then sought to close the weekly market and attempted to close all the shops in the area. The Christian shopkeepers refused to comply with this, leading to an outbreak of violence. More than 20 shops were looted and
destroyed. Three persons were killed.

Attack on Swami Laxmanananda
The violence escalated after news spread about Hindu monk Swami Laxmanananda Saraswati being attacked by Christian fundamentalist mob en route to the spot of the confrontation.

Saraswati stated that he had left for Brahmanigaon to boost the "morale of the majority community". The National Commission for Minorities, in its report, stated that this was "indicative of his desire to exacerbate communal tensions". Swami supporters, however, claimed that Christians at Brahmanigoan village wanted to install a Christmas gate in front of a Hindu temple. This was protested by the local Hindus questioning the motive of Christians in building a second gate near temple while one gate being already present at the place.

In his statement, Swami blamed Radhakant Nayak, a recent Christian convert and Congress Member of Parliament (Upper House)  that allegedly led to further clashes between Hindus and Christians.

The authorities imposed a curfew in order to control the situation. Concerned with rising violence, after the assault on Saraswati, some Dalit Christian leaders lodged a complaint with the Police for protection.

Intervention by CRPF
By 30 December, rioting was brought under control by the security forces such as the CRPF. The total number of security personnel deployed was about 2,500 police and paramilitary. The total number of people taking shelter in relief camps increased to 1200.

2007 Christmas violence in Kandhamal 

The 2007 Christmas violence in Kandhamal started during 24 December 2007 and ended after 4 days between groups led by Sangh Parivar together with the Sangh-affiliated Kui Samaj and the local Christians, which resulted in more than 100 churches, over 100 church institutions and about 700 houses and other structures were burnt down or damaged and at least three people killed.

2008 Kandhamal violence

During the 2008 Kandhamal violence, violence occurred from 25 August 2008 to 28 August 2008 between groups led by Sangh Parivar organizations and Christians in the Kandhamal district of Orissa. The started after the murder of Vishva Hindu Parishad leader Lakshmanananda Saraswati. It is estimated that more than 395 churches, 5600 homes and 13 educational institutes set on fire, demolished or vandalized during the attacks and more than 90 killed (largely Christians) and 18,000 injured and 54,000 displaced. Another report said that around 11,000 people were still living in relief camps, as of October 2008. Some tribals even fled away to border districts in neighbouring states and 310 villages were affected.

In October 2008, a senior Maoist leader claimed responsibility for the murder of Laxmanananda and police officials also confirmed that the Maoists trained youth in the tribal community to murder Laxmanananda.

Post-2008
According to the news agency Agenzia Fides, other Christians were tortured and killed in 2012.

In February 2019, a Christian evangelical who had converted to Christianity nine months earlier was murdered. It is believed that the 'Hindu fanatics' of the village incited Maoists to carry out the killing.

See also
Forced conversion
Criticism of Christianity
Christianity in Odisha
Christianity and violence
Religious violence in India
Persecution of Hindus
Anti-Christian violence in India
Criticism of Hinduism
Persecution of Christians
Religious intolerance

References

External links

 "Blind Faith? Fragile Peace Blown to Bits", CNN-IBN debate, 26 August 2008, 10 p.m. broadcast time IST
 Indian State Struck by Rioting, WSJ article
 Christians cower from Hindu backlash in India's east, Reuters article, Sept 03,2008
 Violence in India Is Fueled by Religious and Economic Divide, The New York Times, Sept 03,2008
Pictures of Violence in Orissa, Reuters

Odisha violence
History of Odisha